German submarine U-573 was a Type VIIC U-boat built for Nazi Germany's Kriegsmarine for service during World War II.

Her keel was laid down 8 June 1940 at the Blohm & Voss yard in Hamburg as yard number 549. She was launched on 17 April 1941 and commissioned on 5 June with Kapitänleutnant Heinrich Heinsohn (12 February 1910 – 6 May 1943) in command. Heinsohn commanded her for her entire career in the Kriegsmarine. In May 1941 he had arranged that the city of Landeck in Tyrol adopted the submarine within the then popular sponsorship programme (Patenschaftsprogramm), organising gifts and holidays for the crew, earning her the honorary name "U-573 Landeck".

The boat began her service career as part of the 3rd U-boat Flotilla when she conducted training; on 1 September 1941 she commenced operations with that flotilla. She was transferred to the 29th Flotilla, also for operations, on 1 January 1942. She was sold to the Spanish Navy that same year and became the Spanish submarine G-7.

Design
German Type VIIC submarines were preceded by the shorter Type VIIB submarines. U-573 had a displacement of  when at the surface and  while submerged. She had two shafts and two  propellers.

U-573 was fitted with five  torpedo tubes (four fitted at the bow and one at the stern), fourteen torpedoes, one  SK C/35 naval gun, 220 rounds, and a  C/30 anti-aircraft gun. The boat had a complement of between forty-four and sixty.

German service
U-573 conducted four war patrols, sinking just one ship.

First, second and third patrols
Her operational career began with her departure from Kiel on 15 September 1941. She entered the Atlantic via the North Sea and the gap between Iceland and the Faroe Islands. She almost reached the Labrador coast before heading for St. Nazaire in occupied France, docking on 15 November.

U-573s second patrol involved the boat slipping past the heavily defended Strait of Gibraltar into the Mediterranean, where she sank the Norwegian Hellen (5,289 GRT) with two torpedoes on 21 December 1941. She arrived at Pola in Croatia on 30 December.

Her third sortie was relatively uneventful, starting and finishing in Pola between 2 February and 6 March 1942.

Fourth patrol and internment
On 29 April 1942, U-573 was attacked with depth charges by Lockheed Hudsons of No. 233 Squadron RAF, northwest of Algiers. Seriously damaged, she limped north to Spain, arriving in Cartagena on 2 May. International agreements allowed ships in neutral ports 24 hours to make emergency repairs before they were to be interned. The Spanish authorities granted U-573 a three-month period for repairs, which prompted several strong protests from the British Embassy in Madrid. On 19 May Heinsohn flew from Madrid to Stuttgart, then travelled on to Berlin, in order to discuss the situation with the Kriegsmarine. He returned by train via Hendaye (in southwest France) on 28 May. On 2 August 1942, at 10 am, (one day before the three-month period was due to expire), the Spanish navy commissioned the boat as the G-7.

U-573s crew suffered no casualties during her career in the Kriegsmarine. The men had been interned in Cartagena and were gradually released in groups of two or three. The last five members of the crew left with Kapitänleutnant Heinsohn on 13 February 1943.

Spanish service
Work started on the U-573, now the G-7, in August 1943 following the sale to Spain but took four years to complete. The damage caused by the British attack was found to be more extensive than was first thought; also German technical assistance and parts were difficult to obtain in the last years of World War II and after. In addition, Spain's economy was weak following the Spanish Civil War. Repairs were completed in early 1947 and on 5 November 1947 G-7 was re-commissioned. The bow's net cutter and the 20mm anti aircraft cannon were removed.

Despite the Type VII being out-dated by the end of World War II, G-7 was the most modern of Spain's submarine fleet; her other vessels (two ex-Italian, and four home-built boats) dating from the early 1930s. G-7 lacked radar and did not possess a snorkel. In 1951 development was started on a snorkel design by Empresa Nacional Bazán, the Spanish shipbuilding company, but these came to nothing when the Spanish Navy bought the former US Navy submarine .

G-7s repairs were completed in 1947. In 1958 Arca-Filmproduktion GmbH rented G-7 to take part in the semi-fictitious movie U 47 – Kapitänleutnant Prien, partially based on his patrol to Scapa Flow, where he sank .

In 1961 the Spanish Navy's submarine force was re-numbered, and G-7 became S-01.

One other U-boat was interned in Spain during World War II: .

On 2 May 1970 she was de-commissioned after 23 years service. She was auctioned for 3,334,751 Pts (about US$26,500), after which, despite efforts to save and preserve her as a museum, the submarine was broken up for scrap.

Summary of raiding history

See also 
 List of submarines of the Spanish Navy

References

Bibliography

External links

 G-7 (U-573) at mundohistoria.org (in Spanish) 
G-7 at perso.wanadoo.es (in Spanish)

1941 ships
German Type VIIC submarines
Maritime incidents in Spain
Ships built in Hamburg
Submarines of Spain
Submarines of the Spanish Navy
U-boats commissioned in 1941
World War II submarines of Germany
Maritime incidents in May 1942
Spain in World War II